"Wij houden van Oranje" (stylized "Wij ♥ Oranje"; Dutch: We Love Orange) is a 1988 Dutch song (and football chant) performed by the Dutch levenslied singer André Hazes and produced by Hans van Hemert. It is based on the melody of the well-known Scottish song "Auld Lang Syne", written by Robert Burns. Orange is the colour of the Dutch royal family. André Hazes sang the song for the first time in 1988 during the European football championships. The Dutch football team sang along on Hazes' single.

André's "Wij houden van Oranje" peaked at No. 3 on the Dutch Top 40. Rapper Ali B recorded a cover version (featuring Hazes) that peaked at No. 2 on the same charts in 2006.

References

External links
 Article on the AD.nl site about the 20th Anniversary of "Wij houden van Oranje"
 Other article about the 20th anniversary of the song

Dutch pop songs
Dutch-language songs
1988 songs
Football songs and chants
André Hazes songs